is a Japanese politician of the Liberal Democratic Party, a member of the House of Representatives in the Diet (national legislature). A native of Niigata, Niigata and graduate of Waseda University, he was elected to the first of his two terms in the assembly of Niigata Prefecture in 1983. After an unsuccessful run in 1993, he was elected to the House of Representatives for the first time in 1996 but lost his seat in 2003. He was re-elected in 2005.

References

External links
 Official website 

Living people
1939 births
People from Niigata (city)
Liberal Democratic Party (Japan) politicians
Members of the House of Representatives (Japan)
21st-century Japanese politicians